Johannes Albertus du Toit (born 2 October 1975 in Windhoek, South-West Africa) is a Namibian rugby union loosehead prop with Plymouth Albion. He played with Namibia at the 2007 Rugby World Cup.

Club career 
 1996 : Western Province U21s
 1997–2000 : Stellenbosch University
 2000 : Western Province
 2001–2003 : Border Bulldogs
 2003–2006 : Griquas
 2007–2008 : Boland Cavaliers
 Since Sept 2008 : Plymouth Albion

References

1975 births
Living people
Expatriate rugby union players in England
Expatriate rugby union players in South Africa
Namibia international rugby union players
Du Toit, Jan
Namibian expatriate rugby union players
Namibian expatriate sportspeople in England
Namibian expatriate sportspeople in South Africa
Namibian rugby union players
Plymouth Albion R.F.C. players
Rugby union players from Windhoek
Rugby union props
Du Toit, Jan